Orabazes II was a king of Characene a kingdom located at the head of the Persian Gulf. His reign was from 150/51 to 165. He was most likely a relative of the Parthian king Vologases IV.

Like most Characene rulers he is primarily known from his coins. As his rule was in the latter part of Characene history, at a time when the state was increasingly weak, we find that the spelling of his name varies between coins and that legends on his coins are consistently partially corrupt. Furthermore, so far only two coins are known that carry a readable date (151 and 156/7 AD).

He is also the first Characene ruler to use Aramaic text although the images on the coin are still Hellenistic.

References

Sources
 

Kings of Characene
2nd-century monarchs in the Middle East
Year of birth missing
Year of death missing
2nd-century deaths
2nd-century Iranian people
Arsacid dynasty of Characene
Vassal rulers of the Parthian Empire